Members of royal families have shown talent in playing musical instruments, singing, or composing music, most often at a gifted amateur level, and on rare occasions having popular hits in their own countries, or giving public performances during most often charities at home, or royal visits abroad. At the same time, those who have been performers, have also been intimately interested in preserving and extending traditional court music and its musicians as patrons of the traditional music and arts of their own countries.

Perhaps the most famous musician in royal families has been Henry VIII of England cited by legend as composing the popular English folk song Greensleeves, as well as several other pieces of greater veracity.

The following is a preliminary list of the more famous members of world royal families with their musical instruments or skills. Citations in the bibliography may include streaming audio of royal compositions.

List

 Austria: Archduke Rudolf of Austria, piano and composing

 Castile: Alfonso X of Castile, various songs 
 Denmark: Frederick IX of Denmark, conducting
 Denmark: Henrik, Prince Consort of Denmark, piano
 England: Henry VIII, composer 
 England: Elizabeth I, Harpsichordist 
 England: Mary I, harpsichordist 
 Prussia: Prince Louis Ferdinand of Prussia (1772–1806), composer and pianist
 Prussia: Frederick II of Prussia, composer 
 Prussia: Princess Philippine Charlotte
 Hawaii: Liliuokalani, composer
 Hawaii: William Charles Lunalilo, lyric writer
 Japan, Crown Prince Naruhito, viola
 Korea, Prince Yi Seok, popular song
 Monaco, Princess Stéphanie of Monaco, popular song
 Portugal, John IV of Portugal, musician 
 Thailand, King Bhumibol Adulyadej, clarinet/saxophone
 UK: Charles III, cello
 UK: Queen Victoria, Organist
 UK: Prince Albert, Organist
 UK: Edward VII, banjoist (classic style)
 UK: Edward VIII, drummer (jazz)

References

Royal